Elizabeth of Sweden - Swedish: Elisabet or Elsa, in some cases also Isabella - may refer to:

Isabella of Austria (also called Elizabeth), Queen of Sweden 1520
Elizabeth of Denmark (1485–1555), Princess of Sweden 1497
Elizabeth (Isabella), Princess of Sweden 1564, daughter of John III of Sweden (died 1566)
Elizabeth Sabina, Princess of Sweden 1582, daughter of Charles IX of Sweden (died 1585)
Princess Elizabeth of Sweden, Princess of Sweden 1549 
Elizabeth Beatrice (Elsa Beata), Princess of Sweden 1652, consort of Duke Adolph John I, Count Palatine of Kleeburg